Anthony Musson is professor of legal history at the University of Exeter. Musson is a barrister of the Middle Temple and a fellow of the Royal Historical Society and the Society of Antiquaries of London.

Selected publications
From the Judge's Arbitrium to the Legality Principle, Berlin, Duncker & Humblot, 2013.
Making Legal History: Approaches and Methodologies, Cambridge, Cambridge University Press, 2012. (with C. Stebbings)
Medieval Petitions: Grace and Grievance, Woodbridge, York Medieval Press, 2009. (with W.M. Ormrod & G. Dodd)
Crime, Law and Society in the Later Middle Ages, Manchester, Manchester University Press, 2009. (with E. Powell) 
The Reign of Edward II: New Perspectives, Woodbridge, York Medieval Press, 2006. (with Gwilym Dodd)
Boundaries of the Law: Geography, Gender and Jurisdiction in Medieval and Early Modern Europe, Aldershot, Ashgate, 2005.
Medieval Law in Context: The Growth of Legal Consciousness from Magna Carta to the Peasants' Revolt, Manchester University Press, 2001.
Expectations of Law in the Middle Ages, Woodbridge, Boydell, 2001.

References 

Living people
Year of birth missing (living people)
Legal historians
Academics of the University of Exeter
British barristers
Fellows of the Royal Historical Society
Fellows of the Society of Antiquaries of London